Philipp Oswald and Filip Polášek were the defending champions but chose not to defend their title.

Zdeněk Kolář and Lukáš Rosol won the title after defeating Sriram Balaji and Divij Sharan 6–2, 2–6, [10–6] in the final.

Seeds

Draw

References

External links
 Main draw

Moneta Czech Open - Doubles
2020 Doubles